The power band of an internal combustion engine or electric motor is the range of operating speeds under which the engine or motor is able to output the most power, that is, the maximum energy per unit of time. This usually means that maximum acceleration can be achieved inside this band (often at the cost of lower efficiency). While engines and motors have a large range of operating speeds, the power band is usually a much smaller range of engine speed, only half or less of the total engine speed range (electric motors are an exception—see the section on electric motors below).

Specifically, power band is the range of  RPM around peak power output. The power band of an internal combustion gasoline automobile engine typically starts at midrange engine speeds (around 4,000 RPM) where maximum torque is produced, and ends below the redline after reaching maximum power (above 5,000 RPM but less than 7,000 RPM). Diesel engines in cars and small trucks may develop maximum torque below 2,000 RPM with the power peak below 5,000 RPM.

Applications
A mechanical transmission with a selection of different gear ratios is designed to make satisfactory power available over the full range of vehicle speeds. The goal of the selection of gear ratios is to keep the engine operating in its power band. The narrower the band, the more gears are needed, closer together in ratio. By careful gear selection, an engine can be operated in its power band, throughout all vehicle speeds. Such use prevents the engine from labouring at low speeds, or exceeding recommended operating speeds.

A narrow power band is often compensated for by a power-splitting device such as a clutch or torque converter to efficiently achieve a wide range of speeds. A continuously variable transmission can also avoid the issues of a narrow power band by keeping the engine running at an optimal speed.

Internal combustion engines
In typical combustion engines found in vehicles, the torque is low at idling speed, reaches a maximal value between 1,500 and 6,500 RPM, and then falls more or less sharply toward the redline. Below the RPM of maximal torque, the compression is not ideal. Above this speed several factors start to limit the torque, such as growing friction, the required time for closing the valves and combustion, and insufficient intake flow. Due to increasing vibration and heat, an external RPM limitation may also be installed. Power is the product of torque multiplied by speed of rotation (analogous to force multiplied by speed in a linear system), so peak power is produced in the upper speed range where there's both high torque and high RPM.

In turbocharged and supercharged engines with potential for abundant torque, an intake pressure regulation system often limits torque to a near-constant figure across the engine speed range to reduce stresses on the engine and provide consistent handling without decreasing peak power.

Gasoline engines
Powerbands can surpass 14,000 RPM in motorcycles and some racing automobiles, such as Formula One cars. Such high speeds are reached by using lightweight pistons and connecting rods with short strokes to reduce inertia, and thus stresses on parts.  Advances in valve technology similarly reduce valve float at such speeds. As an engine grows larger (its stroke in particular), its power band moves to lower speeds.

In more common applications, a modern, well designed and engineered fuel-injected, computer-controlled, multi-valve and optionally variable-valve timing-equipped gasoline engine using good fuel can achieve remarkable flexibility in automobile applications, with sufficient torque even at low engine speeds and a relatively flat power output from 1,500 to 6,500 RPM, allowing easy cruising and forgiving low-speed behaviour. However, achieving maximum power for strong acceleration or high road speed still requires high RPM. Though the literal power band covers most of the operating RPM range, particularly in first gear (as there is no lower gear to shift down to, and no "flat spot" in which the engine does not produce any power), the effective band changes in each gear, becoming the range limited at the upper end by either the limiter, or a point roughly located between peak power and the redline where power drops off, and at the lower end the engine's idling speed.

Diesel engines
A typical road-going ("high-speed") diesel has a narrower band, generating peak torque at lower RPM (often 1,500–2,000 RPM) but also with a sharper fall-off below this, and reaching peak power around 3500-4500 RPM, again rapidly losing strength above this speed. Turbocharged diesel engines with turbo lag (narrowed, exaggerated power band intrinsic to most turbocharged engines) may display this characteristic even more markedly. Therefore, the manufacturer's (or purchaser's/modifier's) choice of gearing, and appropriate use of the available ratios, is even more crucial to make best use of the available power and avoid being "bogged down" in flat spots.

Larger diesel engines in locomotives and some watercraft use diesel-electric drive. This eliminates the complexities of extremely low gearing, as described below.

The largest ("low-speed") diesels—large generators on land and marine diesels at sea—may turn at only hundreds of RPM or even below, with idling speeds of 20-30 RPM. These engines are usually two-stroke diesel engines.

Electric motors
Electric motors are unique in many ways, especially when it comes to the power band. The exact characteristics vary greatly with the type of electric motor. The maximum torque of a universal motor (vacuum cleaner, small machines, drills, starter motors) occurs at zero rotation rate (when stalled) and falls for higher RPM. For induction motors connected to a fixed frequency AC source (most common in large applications), the maximum torque is usually just below the synchronous RPM, sinks to zero for this RPM and becomes negative above it (induction generator); at low RPM the torque is usually slightly lower. Synchronous motors can be used only at the AC source synchronous velocity. In modern applications, synchronous and induction motors with electronic control of the frequency are used, e.g., Brushless DC electric motors. In this case, unless external limitations are applied, the maximum torque is achieved at low RPM.

For example, the AC motor found in the Tesla Roadster (2008) produces near constant maximum torque from 0 to about 6000 RPM, while maximum power occurs at about 10000 RPM, long after torque begins to drop off. The Roadster's redline is 14000 RPM. Other electric motors may in fact produce maximum torque throughout their entire operating range, although their maximum operating speed may be limited for improved reliability.

Gas turbines
Gas turbines operate at extremely high RPM by comparison, and exhibit narrow powerbands, and poor throttleability and throttle response.

See also 
 Combined diesel-electric and gas
 Combined diesel or gas
 Combined gas or gas
 Continuously variable transmission
 Engine tuning
 Overdrive (mechanics)
 Shift kit
 Shift time

Engine technology
Two-stroke engine technology